Pyidawtha may refer to:

Pyidawtha Plan
Pyidawtha (town)